Timeless is a double compilation album by funk group The Isley Brothers, released in 1978. It contains their pre-1973 hits in association with Buddah Records, but now distributed by Epic Records.

Track listing

References

External links

1978 greatest hits albums
The Isley Brothers albums
Funk compilation albums